Nadal is a surname of Catalan, Occitan, and Venetian origin. It stems from the Latin word for birthday, natalis. Notable people with the surname include:
 Augustin Nadal (1659 – 1741), French playwright
 Carlos Nadal (1917–1998), Spanish painter
 Ehrman Syme Nadal (1843–1922), American author, 
 Iván Nadal (born 1987), Argentine footballer
 Joaquim Nadal (born 1948), Spanish politician
 Jordi Nadal (1929–2020), Spanish economist and historian
 Kevin Nadal (born 1978), Filipino American author, comedian, and professor
 Kitchie Nadal (born 1980), Filipina singer, songwriter, musician
 Lymari Nadal (born 1978), Puerto Rican actress
 Maria Chappelle-Nadal (born 1974), American politician
 Miguel Ángel Nadal (born 1966), Spanish international footballer; Rafael Nadal's uncle
 Rafael Nadal (born 1986), Spanish tennis player; Miguel Ángel Nadal's nephew
 Teodoro de Mas y Nadal (1858–1936), Spanish engineer and politician
 Toni Nadal (born 1961), Spanish tennis coach, Rafael Nadal's uncle 
 Xisco Nadal (born 1986), Spanish footballer

References

See also
 

Catalan-language surnames
Italian-language surnames